Gender Queer: A Memoir is a 2019 graphic memoir written and illustrated by Maia Kobabe. It recounts Kobabe's journey from adolescence to adulthood and the author's exploration of gender identity and sexuality, ultimately identifying as being outside of the gender binary.

Gender Queer initially received a small printing and was marketed toward older teens and adults. It increasingly entered the collections of high school and middle school libraries after receiving an Alex Award in 2020, an award given by the American Library Association to "books written for adults that have special appeal to young adults ages 12 through 18." Since 2021, its inclusion in American libraries, particularly school libraries, has been frequently challenged by parents, based on the presence of some sexually explicit illustrations. The American Library Association ranked it as the most challenged book in 2021.

Composition and publication
After coming out as nonbinary in 2016, Kobabe (who uses Spivak pronouns) began drawing black-and-white cartoons about eir experience with eir gender identity, and publishing them on Instagram. E later used these cartoons as the basis for Gender Queer. E stated that e was motivated in part by eir difficulty in explaining eir gender to eir parents after coming out.

Gender Queer was published by Lion Forge Comics on May 28, 2019, receiving a small initial print run of 5,000 copies. The book was marketed to adults and older teens, and Kobabe has stated that this was eir intended audience when writing the book. Following Lion Forge's merger with Oni Press in May 2019, Oni–Lion Forge Publishing Group (OLFPG) has continued to republish Gender Queer now under their Oni Press imprint. In July 2022, a new hardcover edition was released by Oni Press with a foreword by ND Stevenson and an afterword by Kobabe.

Critical reception 
Publishers Weekly's February 2019 review stated that "this heartfelt graphic memoir relates, with sometimes painful honesty, the experience of growing up non-gender-conforming. [...] Kobabe is a straightforward cartoonist who uses the medium skillfully (if not particularly stylishly), incorporating ample cheery colors, with a script that's refreshingly smooth and nondidactic for the topic. This entertaining memoir-as-guide holds crossover appeal for mature teens (with a note there's some sexually explicit content) and is sure to spark valuable discussions at home and in classrooms." The graphic novel was also included in Publishers Weekly's December 2019 "PW Graphic Novel Critics Poll" – Heidi MacDonald wrote that Gender Queer is "an immensely sympathetic memoir of self-discovery, rendered in clean, elegant art, that should become a queer comics classic."

Tegan O'Neil, for The Comics Journal in 2019, commented that "more than simply a memoir, the book is designed to explain the very concept of being non-binary, beginning with the author's first memories of gender and ending with the discovery of Spivak pronouns (e, em, eir) and eir first steps towards getting the people around em to accept and understand said pronouns. [...] Kobabe's art is very readable and, above all, accommodating. E lays out eir personal history with an enviable degree of candor. [...] Part of the book details eir sexual history, as well as a series of terrifying and painful trips to the OBGYN, and even in the most sensitive areas Kobabe's art and storytelling remains both personable and clear." O'Neil also highlighted that "Phoebe Kobabe's colors are strong throughout, a palette of soft pastels and earth tones to communicate a range of emotions."

Jenni Frencham, for the School Library Journal in 2019, called the graphic novel a "great resource for those who identify as nonbinary or asexual as well as for those who know someone who identifies that way and wish to better understand" and stated that it "will resonate with teens, especially fans of Alison Bechdel's Fun Home and Mason Deaver's I Wish You All the Best." Frencham highlighted that "the muted earth tones and calm blues match the hopeful tone and measured pacing. Matter-of-fact descriptions of gynecological exams and the use of sex toys will be enlightening for those who may not have access to this information elsewhere."

Jacob Roden, for The News-Gazette in 2020, wrote that "due to the format, the book is easily digestible in a single sitting, and Kobabe holds the reader's hand every step of the way into the weeds of gender construction. [...] I heartily recommend this book to anyone interested in learning the basics of gender identity. LGBTQ+ folks will especially appreciate the coming out/coming-of-age story and the frequent allusions to queer icons." Roden called the art style "economical, demonstrative, unpretentious, colorful" and highlighted that the writing conveys Kobabe's "experiences with purpose and candor in every panel."

Sophie Brown, for GeekMom in 2022, commented that "Gender Queer isn't an especially easy book to read but it is a powerful one" and that for someone questioning their identity, "Gender Queer will be a comforting voice from someone who has walked the same paths." Brown also highlighted some "harrowing moments" in the book – "Kobabe's first experience going for a pap smear was especially traumatic and resonated with me more than I expected, as I suspect it might for many of us who have had to undergo that procedure while uncomfortable with our bodies and sexualities. Other difficult moments included shopping for undergarments, exploring masturbation, and dating. While all these moments are difficult to read, they are handled beautifully and with a sense of both solidarity and the knowledge that things will eventually get better."

Awards 
In 2020, Gender Queer was one of ten books to receive an Alex Award from the American Library Association, for "books written for adults that have special appeal to young adults ages 12 through 18." In the same year, the book was also a finalist for the Stonewall Book Award for non-fiction. These awards led to the book becoming more widely available in school libraries.

Censorship and controversy in the United States 
Gender Queer has been described as being at the center of a larger wave of challenges to books with LGBT content in 2021, including other examples like Lawn Boy and All Boys Aren't Blue. The American Library Association ranked it as the most challenged book in 2021.

Kobabe has stated that the book's sales have increased following the challenges, and that the controversy has raised eir profile. E has urged those who would challenge the book to read it in its entirety, rather than passing judgement based on a small number of images. Tara Lehmann, publicity director at Oni Press, said to Publishers Weekly in June 2022 that "selling more copies doesn't fix the intrinsic problem: people are trying to police what others read. We are against the banning of books, of any kind" and she added "that Oni supports schools, libraries, and organizations as best it can, but 'our main focus is being supportive of Maia and making sure we're doing the most we can to ensure Gender Queer is available to any and all people who want to read it'."

Sexual imagery

Gender Queer includes a handful of sexually explicit illustrations which have been used to argue that the book is inappropriate for minors.

In one commonly cited panel, a 14-year-old Kobabe fantasizes about a scene in which an older man touches the penis of a youth. The illustration is based on a piece of painted ancient Greek pottery depicting a "courting scene." Detractors have described this as a depiction of pedophilia.

Another illustration frequently cited by critics depicts Kobabe's girlfriend performing oral sex on Kobabe while Kobabe wears a strap-on dildo. The book also includes depiction of masturbation.

These sexually explicit illustrations have been widely reproduced (sometimes in censored form) by critics of the book on social media, at school board meetings, and on conservative television programs. The conservative advocacy group Independent Women's Forum attempted to purchase air time for an advertisement including imagery from Gender Queer but it was rejected as too graphic.

The inclusion of Gender Queer in American public libraries and particularly school libraries has been the subject of numerous challenges beginning in 2021, with objections focusing on a handful of sexually explicit illustrations. Stephanie Mencimer, writing for the progressive website Mother Jones, argues that critics of the book have misrepresented the book as pornographic by focusing on a small number of explicit illustrations, which are generally presented without context.

Community censorship in public and school libraries

Schools 
The book challenges to Gender Queer gained national attention after a September 2021 Fairfax County School Board meeting, when parent Stacey Langton spoke out against the inclusion of Gender Queer and Lawn Boy in the library of her children's high school. Langton brought posters bearing enlarged sexually explicit illustrations from Gender Queer and read from a scene in which Kobabe's girlfriend sends em sexually explicit text messages such as "I cannot wait to have your cock in my mouth." Langton had her microphone cut mid-presentation, which elicited jeers from audience members. Langton's testimony was censored in the official footage of the meeting uploaded by the board, but uncensored footage was captured and uploaded to social media, where it went viral. The story was widely covered by conservative media, such as The Daily Wire, which used the headline "WATCH: School Board Squirms as Mom Reads Them The Gay Porn In Books Available To Students", and on Fox News, which interviewed Langton on its morning show Fox & Friends. Soon after the meeting, the Fairfax County School Board pulled the book from its library collections, but reinstated it months later following an investigation of the book's content.

According to a report from PEN America, school library book bans grew to a "full-fledged social and political movement powered by local, state, and national groups" in the 2021-22 school year. While this censorship movement originally focused on "discussions of race and racism, over the past year, it morphed to include a heightened focus on LGBTQ+ issues and identities" – the report identified Gender Queer as the most frequently challenged book, banned in 41 school districts.

Moms for Liberty, a conservative group founded in Florida in 2020 with chapters around the country, have been leading many of the school board debates about Gender Queer and other LGBTQ+ books. In response to Moms for Liberty, a group called Defense of Democracy was formed in New York in 2022 and has since spread to eight states.

Library responses to censorship 
In response to the growing book censorship movement in the United States, the Brooklyn Public Library opened their library ecard to any individual, ages 13–21 for a limited time under the program Books Unbanned starting in April 2022.

In August 2022, 62% of Jamestown Charter Township residents voted to defund their public library system after librarians refused to remove three books from the library's shelves: Gender Queer, Kiss Number 8 by Colleen A. F. Venable, and Spinning by Tillie Walden. Prior to the vote, two librarians quit after being harassed about the book Gender Queer. Community activists claimed that the presence of these books in the library's young adult and adult sections meant the library was trying to "groom" young children. According to Library Board President Larry Walton, without fund renewal, "the library will run out of money in 2023, jeopardizing its existence." In response to the threat of defunding the library, at least two GoFundMe accounts were started to fund the library through 2023; and by Sunday, August 28, approximately 4,000 people had donated to the campaign, including a $50,000 donation from romance author, Nora Roberts. Attached to Roberts' GoFundMe donation was a note that said, "Libraries and librarians should be valued and celebrated, never attacked and demeaned." In total, $250,000 was raised, which would support keeping the library open for a year or more. A second vote to fund the library for a decade failed in November 2022. After the second vote, two local business owners donated $100,00 to keep the library open. In early December the library closed early one day in response to threats against library staff.

In Bonner’s Ferry, Idaho, the public library director resigned in August 2022 after harassment related to banning books, and Gender Queer in particular.

At a Meridian, Idaho library board meeting in the fall of 2022 the library director stated, "I'm a fourth-generation Idahoan. I've worked in libraries for over two decades. I have never seen this level of vitriol, hate, and thinly veiled threats of violence at libraries." In February of 2023 a group of residents in Meridian filed a petition to eliminate the Meridian Library District in order to restrict access to books they deemed offensive, including Gender Queer. A public hearing will allow comments from Meridian residents on March 20, 2023.

Politics 
Numerous conservative politicians in the United States have challenged Gender Queer and other books. Henry McMaster, Republican governor of South Carolina, called for an investigation into "obscene and pornographic" material such as Gender Queer in the state's schools.

The book was seen as having a significant impact on the 2021 Virginia gubernatorial election race between Republican Glenn Youngkin and Democrat Terry McAuliffe. During the last debate between the two candidates, Youngkin referred to the viral Fairfax County School Board meeting incident which had occurred just five days earlier:

What we've seen over the course of this last 20 months is our school systems refusing to engage with parents. In fact, in Fairfax County this past week, we watched parents get upset because there was such sexually explicit material in the library they had never seen. It was shocking. And in fact, you vetoed the bill that would have informed parents that they were there.

The bill referred to by Youngkin applied only to assigned reading, not books like Gender Queer which were merely present in a school's library. In his response to Youngkin, McAuliffe stated "I don't think parents should be telling schools what to teach." This was widely interpreted as a critical gaffe which contributed to McAuliffe's ultimate loss. Soon after the debate, Youngkin's campaign began running a campaign advertisement which juxtaposed McAuliffe's statement with footage from the Fairfax County board meeting.

In the summer of 2022, Patriot Mobile Action – a conservative political action committee (PAC) – backed the elections of 11 school board members in Texas's Carroll, Grapevine-Colleyville, Keller, and Mansfield School districts. In addition to monetary support, they contracted with top conservative political consulting firms and helped these 11 candidates win school board seats. Following the wins, the Patriot Mobile Action's executive Director stated that their aim is to eliminate "critical race theory" and "LGBTQ indoctrination" from schools.  In August and September 2022, the Keller Independent School District made national and international headlines when it removed 42 books from library shelves, including Gender Queer, the day before school began.

In September 2022, the Maine Families First political action committee and the American Principles Project launched efforts in the 2022 Maine gubernatorial election focused on banning Gender Queer. The American Principles project described these efforts as a multimillion dollar effort to "hold Democrats accountable for grooming our kids." A spokesperson for Janet Mills, the incumbent Democratic governor, stated, "Maine parents don't want a governor interfering in that process, to dictate what books should or shouldn't be in their kids' classroom."

In October 2022, the American Principles Project paid for TV ads against the Michigan Democratic governor, Gretchen Whitmer, that feature a narrator reading passages of Gender Queer while red letters display "stop grooming our kids."

Legal challenges 
In June 2022, Virginian politicians Tim Anderson and Tommy Altman sued Kobabe and Oni–Lion Forge Publishing Group (OLFPG) over Gender Queer by "citing an obscure state obscenity law" and alleged that the graphic novel is "obscene for unrestricted viewing by minors." In response, OLFPG filed a "Demurrer and Motion to Dismiss" which "argues that the petition 'grossly mischaracterizes the nature and subject' of Gender Queer, and that the arguments that the petition submits are irrelevant to the suit and contradicted by the rest of the book. [...] Overall, Oni-Lion Forge Publishing Group argues that the petitioner 'lacks standing' and has not made a strong enough case to establish standing in their argument." The ACLU, "which is representing a group of local bookstores, as well as library and free speech organizations," has also filed a "Motion to Dismiss" – the ACLU's motion highlights "if the court decides that the book is obscene, then selling or distributing it anywhere in the state would be a crime. Retailers could be prosecuted for selling the book without being officially informed that it is obscene. In addition, retailers outside of Virginia Beach could be prosecuted for selling a book that was only determined to be obscene in one county." On August 30, 2022, a Virginia Beach circuit court judge dismissed the petition against Gender Queer; Judge Pamela S. Baskervill wrote that the cited obscenity law was "unconstitutional on its face in that it authorizes a prior restraint that violates the First Amendment and the Constitution of Virginia."

In November 2022, ACLU Texas filed an Office for Civil Rights (OCR) complaint over the Keller Independent School District's ban on books about gender fluidity. The district's policy bans any library book that includes or mentions a transgender or non-binary person, including fictional characters or historical figures; Gender Queer was banned by the district in August 2022. The OCR complaint states that "to assert that the mere presence of a transgender or non-binary character would render a book sexually explicit or age-inappropriate is inflammatory, inaccurate, and discriminatory."

On December 6, 2022, The US Education Department's Office of Civil Rights notified Granbury Independent School District in Northern Texas that it had opened an investigation following a July complaint from the ACLU accusing the district of violating federal law, Title IX, that prohibits discrimination based on sexual orientation and gender. The complaint came after the school district superintendent was secretly recorded talking to district librarians and telling them, "There are two genders. There's male and there's female" and then he went on to say, "there's no place for it in our libraries." In the same meeting he told librarians to remove "the 850 books that were put forth by Representative Krause...plus any that that we think that do not conform." Gender Queer is among the 850 books on Krause's list. This is the first federal investigation tied to the nationwide movement in the US to ban library books dealing with sexuality and gender.

Editions

See also

 Anti-LGBT curriculum laws in the United States
 Book censorship in the United States

References

External links 
 Books Unbanned, Brooklyn Public Library
 National Public Radio (NPR) essay by Maia Kobabe: Struggling kids told me my book helped them talk to parents
 NPR interview

2019 graphic novels
LGBT young adult literature
Censored books
Autobiographical graphic novels
American memoirs
Obscenity controversies in literature
LGBT-related controversies in literature
LGBT-related graphic novels
2010s LGBT literature
LGBT literature in the United States
Censored comics
Censorship of LGBT issues